Alton Devon Mason (born November 21, 1997) is an American male model, the first black male model to have walked for Chanel. GQ Australia named him male model of the year in 2019 and Forbes listed him in its 30 Under 30 2021 for Art & Style.

Early life 
Alton Mason was born in Nebraska. His father, Alton Mason Sr., is a former professional basketball player and his mother is a former model. He is the eldest of 4 children. Due to his father's career, the family moved regularly, living in several European countries, until finally settling in Arizona. When he was 17, he moved away from Arizona to study dancing and acting at the American Musical and Dramatic Academy in Los Angeles, California.

Career 
Through choreographer Laurieann Gibson, he was able to obtain a position as backup dancer for Diddy at the BET Awards 2015, which eventually led to being signed by a modeling agency. Mason was then discovered on Instagram and cast for Kanye West's Yeezy Season 3 show at Madison Square Garden. Two years later, he walked for the Gucci Fall 2017 show at the Milan Fashion Week. He also made appearances at the New York Fashion Week for Hugo Boss, and in a short film modeling clothes designed by Pharrell Williams for Chanel. He was part of the spring/summer campaign for Lacoste in 2019. Other brands Mason has modeled for include Gucci, Versace, Fenty x Puma, Michael Kors, Puma, Philipp Plein, Jeremy Scott, Tom Ford, Valentino, Fendi, Karl Lagerfeld, Louis Vuitton, and Off-White.

In 2020, he filmed in Lagos, Nigeria a music video for his first single "Gimme Gimme", as part of the soundtrack of Amarachi Nwosu and Soof Light's short film Rise in Light, in which he also starred. The video was used to publicize a fundraising in support of Nigerian communities, collecting more than $10,000 for the Aga Khan Foundation.

Mason portrayed Little Richard in Baz Luhrmann's biopic Elvis.

References 

1997 births
21st-century American male actors
African-American male models
Living people
Male actors from Arizona
Male actors from Nebraska
American Musical and Dramatic Academy alumni